Matching Green is a village and the largest settlement in the civil parish of Matching, in Essex, England.

Matching Green has one of the largest village greens in Essex.  The green is almost triangular in shape, covers 5.6 hectares (13.8 acres), contains the local cricket field, and is edged by mainly detached cottages and houses dating from the 14th to 19th century, twenty-eight of which are listed buildings. The village public house is The Chequers at the western edge of the green.

The site of the former RAF Matching lies to the east of village.

Matching parish settlements 
 Carter's Green
 Housham Tye
 Matching
 Matching Green
 Matching Tye
 Newman's End

Transport

Bus

References

External links 
 
 Matching Green Local History
 Matching Parish Council
 Matching Green Cricket Club
 Matching Green Primary School

Villages in Essex
Matching, Essex